Blakenall Heath is a suburban village in the Metropolitan Borough of Walsall in the West Midlands County, England. It straddles the border of Walsall and Bloxwich. Historically the village was a part of Staffordshire. It was originally a rural area between Walsall and Bloxwich with a small amount of private housing as recently as the beginning of the 20th century, but the area began to change dramatically after the end of the Great War.

Farmland gave way to council housing, which surrounded the local church and a few pre-1914 buildings, and further developments took place over the next few decades. Walsall borough's first council house was completed in Blakenall Heath, on Blakenall Lane, in June 1920. Within seven years, 500 council houses had been built in the area, and by 1939 around 2,000 new council houses had been built in the Blakenall Heath, Harden, Coal Pool and Goscote areas. 
Several hundred more had followed by the 1970s, including three tower blocks of flats which were built in the late 1950s, as well as maisonettes in Walker Road which were built in the 1960s but quickly became unpopular with tenants as well as proving a magnet for crime, and were in demolished in 1985.

The early council housing developments were divided between established neighbourhoods including Blakenall Lane and Harden Road, and new housing estates with themed street names; including the 1930s Poet's Estate at Harden (where road names included Shakespeare Crescent, Goldsmith Road and Tennyson Road) and the Green Rivers Estate at Blakenall Heath itself (where road names included Thames Road, Wye Road and Mersey Road) which was built in the 1940s and 1950s.

Blakenall Heath is the centre of the Blakenall ward of Walsall, which has traditionally had some of the highest poverty and crime rates in the Metropolitan Borough of Walsall. Blakenall also includes neighbouring Harden, Goscote and Coal Pool.

Between 2001 and 2006, some of the council housing around Blakenall Heath was demolished, including the whole of Taylor Avenue, the three late 1950s tower blocks, and large sections of Walker Road and Barracks Lane. Demolition has also taken place in neighbouring Harden and Goscote. New housing for the public and private sector has since been built in the place of the demolished council houses and flats.

The parish church for Blakenall Heath is Christ Church, which is constructed from limestone and opened in 1872.

Gallery

References

Areas of the West Midlands (county) 
Walsall